Junayna Ahmed (born 30 June 2003) is a Bangladeshi swimmer. She represented Bangladesh at the 2019 World Aquatics Championships held in Gwangju, South Korea. She competed in the women's 50 metre freestyle and women's 200 metre butterfly events. In both events she did not advance to compete in the semi-finals.

In 2019, she won the bronze medal in the women's 400 metre individual medley event at the South Asian Games held in Nepal. She also won the bronze medal in the women's 200 metre freestyle, women's 800 metre freestyle and women's 200 metre butterfly events.

She competed in the women's 50 metre freestyle event at the 2020 Summer Olympics held in Tokyo, Japan.

References

External links
 

Living people
2003 births
Sportspeople from London
Bangladeshi female swimmers
Female butterfly swimmers
Bangladeshi female freestyle swimmers
South Asian Games bronze medalists for Bangladesh
South Asian Games medalists in swimming
Swimmers at the 2020 Summer Olympics
Olympic swimmers of Bangladesh
21st-century Bangladeshi women